PBIL may refer to:
 Population-based incremental learning
 Protein Bio Informatics Laboratory (KAIST)